Ace Ventura: Pet Detective is a 1994 American comedy film starring Jim Carrey as Ace Ventura, an animal detective who is tasked with finding the abducted dolphin mascot of the Miami Dolphins football team. The film was directed by Tom Shadyac, who wrote the screenplay with Jack Bernstein and Jim Carrey. The film co-stars Courteney Cox, Tone Loc, Sean Young, and then-Miami Dolphins quarterback Dan Marino and features a cameo appearance from death metal band Cannibal Corpse.

It grossed $72.2 million in the United States and Canada and $35 million in other territories for a worldwide total of $107.2 million. It received mixed reviews from critics. Carrey's performance led to the film having a cult following among male adolescents. In addition to launching Carrey's film career, it also started a franchise, spawning the sequel film Ace Ventura: When Nature Calls (1995), the animated television series Ace Ventura: Pet Detective (three seasons, 1995–2000), and later, standalone made-for-television sequel Ace Ventura Jr.: Pet Detective (2009).

Plot
Ace Ventura is an unorthodox Miami-based private detective who specializes in retrieving tame or captive animals. He struggles to pay his rent and is often mocked by the Miami Police Department, led by Lieutenant Lois Einhorn, who finds Ventura insufferable. Two weeks before the Super Bowl, the Miami Dolphins' mascot, a bottlenose dolphin named Snowflake, is kidnapped at Joe Robbie Stadium. Melissa Robinson, the team's chief publicist, hires Ventura to find Snowflake.

Searching Snowflake's tank for clues, Ventura finds a rare triangle-cut orange amber stone in the filter. Ace suspects billionaire Ronald Camp may have stolen Snowflake, as he is known for collecting exotic animals through less-than-reputable means and sources. Ventura and Melissa sneak into Camp's party, where Ventura mistakes a shark for Snowflake and is nearly eaten. Camp apologizes and shakes Ventura's hand, revealing on one of his own fingers a ring with an amber stone set identical to the one Ventura found. Ruling out Camp, as his ring was not missing the amber stone, Ventura recognizes the stone as part of a 1984 AFC Championship ring and concludes that a member of the 1984 Miami Dolphins line-up may have kidnapped Snowflake, and attempts to identify the culprit by their rings. However, he discovers all of the team members' rings are intact.

Roger Podacter, the team's head of operations, mysteriously dies after falling from his apartment balcony. Einhorn declares it a suicide, but Ventura proves that it was murder because the soundproof balcony glass doors were closed when the police arrived despite a neighbor claiming to have heard screaming. He comes across an old photograph of the football team, discovering an unfamiliar player named Ray Finkle, who was added as a placekicker in mid-season. Finkle missed a relatively easy field-goal kick at the end of Super Bowl XVII, which cost the Dolphins the championship and ruined his career. Visiting Finkle's parents, Ventura learns that Finkle blamed quarterback Dan Marino for allegedly mishandling the ball before the kick, and became so fixated on this that he was committed to a mental hospital for homicidal tendencies. Marino himself is kidnapped shortly thereafter. Ventura visits Einhorn, pitching his theory that Finkle kidnapped both Marino and Snowflake in an act of revenge, as he was offended that the dolphin has been given Finkle's old team number and a field-goal trick to boot; he also theorizes that Finkle murdered Podacter when the latter discovered him snooping around his apartment. Einhorn compliments Ventura and kisses him before attempting to dissuade him from continuing the case since there is now a suspect, but Ventura refuses since he is still under contract by the Dolphins to locate Snowflake.

Ventura and Melissa go to the mental hospital, where Ventura poses as a potential patient.  Ventura uncovers a newspaper article in Finkle's possessions about a missing hiker named Lois Einhorn. Piecing together the evidence, Ventura, to his shock and disgust, realizes that Einhorn is Finkle: Finkle underwent plastic surgery to take on the identity of the missing Einhorn, and took advantage of her position in the Miami Police Department to get revenge on Marino and the Dolphins. On Super Bowl Sunday, Ventura follows Einhorn to an abandoned yacht storage facility where she has Marino and Snowflake held hostage. Einhorn calls the police, blaming Ventura with no proof. Melissa and Ventura's friend, police officer Emilio, suspecting the deception, stage a hostage situation to get the police to listen to Ventura. To prove Einhorn is Finkle, Ace strips her of her clothes and, with help from Marino, reveals that Einhorn never got the penectomy and vaginoplasty necessary to perfect the disguise; Podacter discovered this during a date with Einhorn and was pushed off the balcony to stop him from revealing this to the public.

Einhorn/Finkle is arrested by the police after attacking Ventura, and her ring is confirmed to have the stone missing. Marino and Snowflake are welcomed back during half-time at the Super Bowl; Ventura is then shown on the stadium's jumbotron and acknowledged as their savior, even as he gets into a scuffle with the Philadelphia Eagles' mascot Swoop over a rare pigeon, receiving a large ovation from the crowd.

Cast

 Jim Carrey as Ace Ventura
 Courteney Cox as Melissa Robinson
 Sean Young as Lt. Lois Einhorn / Ray Finkle
 Tone Loc as Emilio
 Dan Marino as Himself
 John Capodice as Sgt. Aguado
 Noble Willingham as Riddle
 Troy Evans as Roger Podacter
 Raynor Scheine as Woodstock
 Udo Kier as Ronald Camp
 Frank Adonis as Vinnie
 Tiny Ron as Roc
 David Margulies as Doctor
 Bill Zuckert as Mr. Finkle
 Judy Clayton as Martha Mertz
 Alice Drummond as Mrs. Finkle
 Rebecca Ferratti as Sexy Woman
 Mark Margolis as Mr. Shickadance, Ace's landlord
 Randall "Tex" Cobb as Gruff Man
 Cannibal Corpse as themselves

Production
The Chairman and CEO of Morgan Creek Productions, James G. Robinson, sought in the early 1990s to produce a comedy that would have wide appeal. Gag writer Tom Shadyac pitched a rewrite of the script to Robinson and was hired as director for what was his directorial debut. Filmmakers first approached Rick Moranis to play Ace Ventura, but Moranis declined the role. They then considered casting Judd Nelson or Alan Rickman, and they also considered changing Ace Ventura to be female and casting Whoopi Goldberg as the pet detective. David Alan Grier also turned down to play Ace Ventura. Ultimately the producers noticed Jim Carrey's performance in the sketch comedy show In Living Color and cast him as Ace Ventura. Lauren Holly turned down the role of Melissa Robinson, which eventually went to Courtney Cox.

Carrey helped rewrite the script, and filmmakers allowed him to improvise on set. Carrey said of his approach: "I knew this movie was going to either be something that people really went for, or it was going to ruin me completely. From the beginning of my involvement, I said that the character had to be rock 'n' roll. He had to be the 007 of pet detectives. I wanted to be unstoppably ridiculous, and they let me go wild". He said he sought comedic moments that would be unappealing to some: "I wanted to keep the action unreal and over the top. When it came time to do my reaction to kissing a man, I wanted it to be the biggest, most obnoxious, homophobic reaction ever recorded. It's so ridiculous it can't be taken seriously--even though it guarantees that somebody's going to be offended".

Filming took place in Miami, Florida in the second quarter of 1993.

Music
The film score was composed by Ira Newborn. The soundtrack, produced by Morgan Creek Records, included a variety of songs by other musicians.

Release
The film grossed  on its opening weekend, ranking first at the box office and outperforming other new releases My Father the Hero and I'll Do Anything. Opening-weekend audiences surveyed by CinemaScore gave the film a grade "A−" on a scale of A to F. For its second weekend, it grossed  and ranked first at the box office again, outperforming newcomers The Getaway, Blank Check, and My Girl 2. Variety reported of Ace Venturas second weekend in box office performance: "The goofball comedy defied dire predictions by trackers, slipping just 20% for a three-day average of $5,075 and $24.6 million in 10 days". The Los Angeles Times reported: "Audiences are responding enthusiastically to Carrey's frenzied antics... [The film] is especially a hit with the 10- to 20-year-old age group it was originally targeted for. Box-office grosses indicate that many fans are going back to see the film again". The film's US box office performance led Variety to label it a "sleeper hit". Its best performance overseas was in Italy. On home video, Ace Ventura sold 4.2 million home videos in its first three weeks, which Los Angeles Times called "just as powerful a draw" as its theatrical run.

Carrey also starred in The Mask and Dumb and Dumber later in the year.

The Hollywood Reporter said before Ace Ventura, Jim Carrey was "seen mainly as TV talent" and that with the film's success, it "firmly [established] him as a big-screen presence". The film's success also led Morgan Creek Productions to produce the 1995 sequel Ace Ventura: When Nature Calls with Carrey reprising his role. Author Victoria Flanagan wrote that Carrey's performance "generated cult success for the film among adolescent male viewers". The Hollywood Reporter wrote that it "gained a loyal cult following through frequent TV airings". NME wrote in retrospect that the film was a "cult 1990s comedy".

Ace Ventura: Pet Detective was released on VHS on June 14, 1994, DVD on August 26, 1997, and Blu-ray on September 3, 2013 by Warner Home Video. Sony Pictures Home Entertainment released the film on Blu-ray for the 25th Anniversary Edition in April 2019.

Critical reception
The Los Angeles Times reported at the time, "Not many critics have been charmed by Ace Ventura's exploits, and several have charged that the film's humor is mean-spirited, needlessly raunchy and homophobic." A biography on Carrey wrote that "the fans loved him and the critics hated him". Ace Ventura: Pet Detective received "generally unfavorable" reviews from contemporary critics, according to review aggregator Metacritic, which assessed 14 reviews and categorized six as negative, five as positive, and three as mixed. It gave the film an overall score of 37 out of 100. The review aggregation website Rotten Tomatoes assessed a sample of 62 contemporary and retrospective reviews as positive or negative and said 48% of the critics gave positive reviews with an average rating of 5/10. In 2019, Rotten Tomatoes wrote of the consensus, "Jim Carrey's twitchy antics and gross-out humor are on full, bombastic display in Ace Ventura: Pet Detective, which is great news for fans of his particular brand of comedy but likely unsatisfying for anyone else."

Roger Ebert, reviewing for the Chicago Sun-Times, said, "I found the movie a long, unfunny slog through an impenetrable plot." Ebert described the lead role, "Carrey plays Ace as if he's being clocked on an Energy-O-Meter, and paid by the calories expended. He's a hyper goon who likes to screw his mouth into strange shapes while playing variations on the language." Steve Gaydos of Variety praised Carrey's "ceaseless energy and peculiar talents" but reported, "Film sputters and eventually slows to a trot due to the script's inability to give Carrey anything more than a free rein to mug and strut, and a third-act payoff that takes the film's generally inoffensive tastelessness into a particularly brutal and unpleasant stew of homophobia and misogyny." The New York Times film critic Stephen Holden said, "The comic actor Jim Carrey gives one of the most hyperactive performances ever brought to the screen... Only a child could love Mr. Carrey's character, but that may be the point. The movie has the metabolism, logic and attention span of a peevish 6-year-old." He said of Ace Ventura's animals, "The few scenes of Ace communicating with his animals hint at an endearing wackiness that is abruptly undercut by the movie's ridiculous plot."

The Washington Posts film critics Rita Kempley and Desson Howe reviewed the film positively. Kempley said, "A riot from start to finish, Carrey's first feature comedy is as cheerfully bawdy as it is idiotically inventive." She added, "A spoof of detective movies, the story touches all the bases." Howe said that the film "is a mindless stretch of nonsense" and highlighted multiple "Carreyisms along the way". Howe concluded, "There are some unfortunate elements that were unnecessary -- a big strain of homophobic jokes for one, profane and sexual situations that rule out the kiddie audience for another. But essentially, Ace is an unsophisticated opportunity to laugh at the mischief Carrey's body parts can get up to."

James Berardinelli said, "The comic momentum sputters long before the running time has elapsed." Berardinelli said of Carrey that he "uses his rubber features and goofy personae" that succeeds for a short time but after that, "Carrey's act gradually grows less humorous and more tiresome, and the laughter in the audience seems forced." The critic said the film has "its moments" of humor but considered there to be "a lot of dead screen time" in between.

While Michael MacCambridge of Austin American-Statesman named it as an honorable mention of his list of the best films of 1994, Rocky Mountain Newss Rober Denerstein listed it as the second worst of the year.

Accolades

Transgender portrayal
The film has been criticized for the way it portrays transgender people. Alexandra Gonzenbach Perkins wrote in Representing Queer and Transgender Identity that mainstream representation of transgender identity at the turn of the 21st century was limited, observing that "the representations that did exist tended to pathologize transgender people as mentally unstable". Perkins said Ace Ventura, along with The Crying Game, depicted "transgender characters as murderous villains".
 
In the book Reclaiming Genders, in a chapter focusing on transgender identity, Gordene O. Mackenzie references Ace Ventura as an example of turn-of-the-century films that "illustrate the transphobia implicit in many popular US films". Mackenzie describes the scene in which Ace Ventura retches in the bathroom, following the revelation that the woman he had kissed is trans, as "one of the most memorable and blatantly transphobic/homophobic scenes". In The New York Times in 2016, Farhad Manjoo also wrote about this scene: "There was little culturally suspect then about playing gender identity for laughs. Instead, as in many fictional depictions of transgender people in that era, the scene’s prevailing emotion is of nose-holding disgust."

Future
In October 2017, Morgan Creek Entertainment announced plans to reboot several films from its library, including Ace Ventura: Pet Detective. Its president David Robinson said Morgan Creek's plan was not to simply remake the film, but to do a follow-up in which Ace Ventura passes the mantle to a new character, such as a long-lost son or daughter. In 2018, according to Ace Ventura: When Nature Calls co-star Tommy Davidson, Carrey displayed a lack of interest in participating.

By March 2021, a sequel film was in development at Amazon Studios with the screenwriters of the 2020 film Sonic the Hedgehog, Pat Casey and Josh Miller, attached.

References

External links

 
 
 Ace Ventura: Pet Detective reviews repository at Rotten Tomatoes

1994 films
1994 comedy films
1990s crime comedy films
1990s comedy mystery films
1990s sports comedy films
Fiction set in 1984
Ace Ventura
American crime comedy films
American football films
American sports comedy films
American comedy mystery films
American detective films
1990s English-language films
American films about revenge
Films directed by Tom Shadyac
Films set in Miami
Films shot in Florida
Morgan Creek Productions films
American LGBT-related films
1994 LGBT-related films
LGBT-related sports comedy films
LGBT-related controversies in film
Films about trans women
Warner Bros. films
Films scored by Ira Newborn
Fictional portrayals of the Miami-Dade Police Department
Films adapted into television shows
Films with screenplays by Tom Shadyac
1994 directorial debut films
1990s American films